Carabidomemnus is a genus of beetles in the family Carabidae, containing the following species:

 Carabidomemnus acutipennis Luna De Carvalho, 1975 
 Carabidomemnus arthopteroides Luna De Carvalho, 1980 
 Carabidomemnus baenningeri (H.Kolbe, 1927) 
 Carabidomemnus besucheti Luna De Carvalho, 1977 
 Carabidomemnus brachynoides Luna De Carvalho, 1959 
 Carabidomemnus decellei (Basilewsky, 1962) 
 Carabidomemnus endroedyfilius Luna De Carvalho, 1973 
 Carabidomemnus evansi (Reichensperger, 1933) 
 Carabidomemnus feae (Gestro, 1902) 
 Carabidomemnus fulvescens (H.Kolbe, 1927) 
 Carabidomemnus hammondi Luna De Carvalho, 1974 
 Carabidomemnus hargreavesi Reichensperger, 1930 
 Carabidomemnus ituriensis Reichensperger, 1933 
 Carabidomemnus jeanfoxae Luna De Carvalho, 1967 
 Carabidomemnus kirbii (Westwood, 1864) 
 Carabidomemnus lecordieri Luna De Carvalho, 1978 
 Carabidomemnus luluanus Basilewsky, 1950 
 Carabidomemnus lunacarvalhoi Nagel, 1983 
 Carabidomemnus methneri (H.Kolbe, 1927) 
 Carabidomemnus minutus (H.Kolbe, 1927) 
 Carabidomemnus mollicellus C.A. Dohrn, 1880
 Carabidomemnus ozaenoides Luna De Carvalho, 1956 
 Carabidomemnus pallidus (Raffray, 1885) 
 Carabidomemnus reichenspergeri Basilewsky, 1950 
 Carabidomemnus seineri (H.Kolbe, 1927) 
 Carabidomemnus vaticinus (H.Kolbe, 1927) 
 Carabidomemnus vilhenai Luna De Carvalho, 1959

References

Paussinae